Gilbert Collins (August 26, 1846 – January 29, 1920) was the 23rd mayor of Jersey City, New Jersey from May 5, 1884, to May 2, 1886.

Biography
Collins was born on August 26, 1846, in Stonington, Connecticut the son of Sarah Quinn and Daniel Webster Collins. His family immigrated to American from Kent, England before the American Revolution. His grandfather, Daniel Collins was a lieutenant in a Connecticut regiment during the Revolution. He attended Yale University, but the death of his father in 1862 forced him to leave school for financial reasons. In 1863, he moved to Jersey City and studied law under Jonathan Dixon (who was appointed an associate justice of the New Jersey Supreme Court in 1875). Collins began practicing law in Jersey City in 1869. On January 2, 1870, he married Harriet Kingsbury Bush of Jersey City. A Republican, Collins unsuccessfully ran for the New Jersey Senate in 1880. On March 25, 1884, Collins was nominated for mayor by the Independents of Jersey City. He was also later nominated by the Republicans. In the election, Collins easily defeated Democrat John D. McGill by a 3,250 majority in the heavily Democratic city. He served one term and was succeeded by Democrat Orestes Cleveland.
  
In 1892, Collins was a delegate to the Republican National Convention in Minneapolis that re-nominated Benjamin Harrison.

On March 2, 1897, Collins was appointed by Governor John W. Griggs as an associate justice to the New Jersey Supreme Court and served until his resignation in 1903. He continued to practice law.

Collins died of pneumonia in his home in Jersey City on January 29, 1920. He was buried in the family vault in Hilliard Cemetery in Stonington.

References

1846 births
1920 deaths
People from Stonington, Connecticut
Yale University alumni
New Jersey Republicans
Mayors of Jersey City, New Jersey
Justices of the Supreme Court of New Jersey
Deaths from pneumonia in New Jersey